Justicia tocantina (syn. Chaetothylax tocantinus Nees, and Justicia tocantinus (Nees) V.A.W.Graham) is a plant native to Argentine, and the Cerrado vegetation of Brazil. This plant is cited in Flora Brasiliensis by Carl Friedrich Philipp von Martius.

External links
 Flora Brasiliensis: Chaetothylax tocantinus

tocantina
Flora of Brazil